This is a list of international visits undertaken by Warren Christopher (in office 1993–1997) while serving as the United States Secretary of State. The list includes both private travel and official state visits. The list includes only foreign travel which the Secretary of State made during his tenure in the position.

Summary 
The number of visits per country where Secretary Christopher traveled are:
 One visit to Angola, Argentina, Austria, Brazil, Brunei, Cambodia, Chile, Cyprus, El Salvador, Ethiopia, Finland, Greece, Kazakhstan, Luxembourg, Malaysia, Mali, Norway, Poland, Portugal, Serbia and Montenegro, Singapore, South Africa, Tanzania, Thailand, Trinidad and Tobago, Tunisia, Vatican City and Vietnam
 Two visits to Australia, Belarus, Bosnia and Herzegovina, China, Czech Republic, Haiti, Hungary, Latvia, Mexico, Morocco, Netherlands, Philippines, Spain and Turkey
 Three visits to Canada, Indonesia, Kuwait and Lebanon
 Four visits to South Korea and Ukraine
 Five visits to Italy and Saudi Arabia
 Six visits to Germany, Japan and Russia
 Seven visits to the United Kingdom
 Eight visits to France, Jordan and the Palestinian National Authority
 Ten visits to Belgium
 Eleven visits to Switzerland
 Fifteen visits to Egypt
 Twenty-nine visits to Syria
 Thirty-four visits to Israel

Table

References

1993 beginnings
1996 endings
1990s in international relations
1990s politics-related lists
United States Secretary of State
S
Warren Christopher
United States diplomacy-related lists
|Christopher
1990s timelines